Paul William Te Ariki is a New Zealand former professional rugby league footballer who played in the 1980s.

Playing career

Representative career
Te Ariki represented New Zealand in 1980 against Australia, and on the tour of Great Britain and France.

References

New Zealand national rugby league team players
New Zealand rugby league players
Place of birth missing (living people)
Rugby league props
Wellington rugby league team players
Year of birth missing (living people)
New Zealand Māori rugby league players
Living people